Thomas Osborne Davis (16 August 1856 – 23 January 1917) was a Canadian Member of Parliament in the House of Commons of Canada representing the Provisional District of Saskatchewan, and later a member of the Senate of Canada.

He was tutored by his father Samuel Davis and became a general merchant at Prince Albert, Northwest Territories. In 1885, he married Rebecca Jennings. He served on the town council for Prince Albert and was mayor from 1894 to 1895.

Davis died in office in Prince Albert at the age of 60. His son Thomas Clayton Davis also served as mayor of Prince Albert, going on to serve in the Saskatchewan assembly, as a Saskatchewan judge and as an ambassador for Canada. Davis' daughter Alice was married to hockey executive and banker H. J. Sterling.

Legacy
The hamlet of Davis, Saskatchewan was named after him.

References

Canadian senators from Saskatchewan
Canadian senators from the Northwest Territories
Liberal Party of Canada MPs
Liberal Party of Canada senators
Members of the House of Commons of Canada from Saskatchewan
Members of the House of Commons of Canada from the Northwest Territories
Pre-Confederation Saskatchewan people
Mayors of Prince Albert, Saskatchewan
Canadian merchants
1856 births
1917 deaths
19th-century Canadian politicians
20th-century Canadian politicians